Gompholobium tomentosum, commonly known as hairy yellow pea, is a species of flowering plant in the pea family Fabaceae and is endemic to the south-west of Western Australia. It is an erect shrub with hairy foliage, pinnate leaves with five to seven leaflets, and uniformly yellow, pea-like flowers.

Description
Flowering occurs from July to January and the fruit is a cylindrical pod.

Taxonomy
Gompholobium tomentosum was first formally described in 1805 by Jacques Labillardière in  Novae Hollandiae Plantarum Specimen. The specific epithet (tomentosum) means "tomentose".

Distribution and habitat
This species of pea grows on coastal limestone, sand dunes and plains  in the Avon Wheatbelt, Esperance Plains, Geraldton Sandplains, Jarrah Forest, Mallee, Swan Coastal Plain, Warren and Yalgoo biogeographic regions of south-western Western Australia.

Conservation status
Gompholobium tomentosum is classified as "not threatened" by the Government of Western Australia Department of Biodiversity, Conservation and Attractions.

References

Mirbelioids
tomentosum
Fabales of Australia
Flora of Western Australia
Plants described in 1805
Taxa named by Jacques Labillardière